19th SDFCS Awards
December 15, 2014

Best Film: 
Nightcrawler

Best Director: 
Dan Gilroy
Nightcrawler

The 19th San Diego Film Critics Society Awards were announced on December 15, 2014.

Winners and nominees

Best Film
Nightcrawler
Boyhood
Gone Girl
The Grand Budapest Hotel
Selma
The Theory of Everything

Best Director
Dan Gilroy – Nightcrawler
Wes Anderson – The Grand Budapest Hotel
David Fincher – Gone Girl
Alejandro G. Iñárritu – Birdman
Richard Linklater – Boyhood

Best Actor
Jake Gyllenhaal – Nightcrawler
Ralph Fiennes – The Grand Budapest Hotel
Brendan Gleeson – Calvary
Tom Hardy – Locke
Michael Keaton – Birdman
Eddie Redmayne – The Theory of Everything

Best Actress
Marion Cotillard – Two Days, One Night
Felicity Jones – The Theory of Everything
Rosamund Pike – Gone Girl
Hilary Swank – The Homesman
Mia Wasikowska – Tracks

Best Supporting Actor
Mark Ruffalo – Foxcatcher
Riz Ahmed – Nightcrawler
Ethan Hawke – Boyhood
Edward Norton – Birdman
J. K. Simmons – Whiplash

Best Supporting Actress
Rene Russo – Nightcrawler
Patricia Arquette – Boyhood
Carrie Coon – Gone Girl
Keira Knightley – The Imitation Game
Emma Stone – Birdman

Best Original Screenplay
Nightcrawler – Dan GilroyBirdman – Alejandro G. Iñárritu, Nicolás Giacobone, Alexander Dinelaris Jr., and Armando Bo
Boyhood – Richard Linklater
The Grand Budapest Hotel – Wes Anderson and Hugo Guinness
Locke – Steven Knight

Best Adapted ScreenplayGone Girl – Gillian FlynnThe Fault in Our Stars – Scott Neustadter and Michael H. Weber
The Theory of Everything – Anthony McCarten
Unbroken – Joel Coen, Ethan Coen, William Nicholson, and Richard LaGravenese
Wild – Nick Hornby

Best Animated FilmThe Boxtrolls
Big Hero 6
How to Train Your Dragon 2
The Lego Movie
The Nut Job

Best Documentary
Citizenfour
Elaine Stritch: Shoot Me
Glen Campbell: I'll Be Me
Last Days in Vietnam
Life Itself

Best Foreign Language Film
Force Majeure • SwedenHeli • Mexico
Ida • Demark / Poland
Two Days, One Night • Belgium
Venus in Fur • France

Best CinematographyNightcrawler – Robert ElswitForce Majeure – Fredrik Wenzel
Gone Girl – Jeff Cronenweth
Interstellar – Hoyte van Hoytema
Unbroken – Roger Deakins

Best EditingEdge of Tomorrow – James Herbert and Laura JenningsBoyhood – Sandra Adair
Gone Girl – Kirk Baxter
The Grand Budapest Hotel – Barney Pilling
Nightcrawler – John Gilroy

Best Production DesignThe Grand Budapest Hotel – Adam Stockhausen and Anna PinnockThe Imitation Game – Maria Djurkovic
Interstellar – Nathan Crawley
Into the Woods – Dennis Gassner and Anna Pinnock
The Theory of Everything – John Paul Kelly

Best ScoreNightcrawler – James Newton HowardBirdman – Antonio Sánchez
Gone Girl – Trent Reznor and Atticus Ross
The Grand Budapest Hotel – Alexandre Desplat
The Imitation Game – Alexandre Desplat

Best EnsembleBirdman
Boyhood
The Grand Budapest Hotel
The Imitation Game
Selma

Best Body of Work
Willem Dafoe for  The Fault in Our Stars, The Grand Budapest Hotel, John Wick, A Most Wanted Man, and Nymphomaniac

References

External links
 Official Site

2
2014 film awards
2014 in American cinema